Resectoscope may refer to:

 Cystoscope, with a cauterization loop to avail for resection of tissue
 Hysteroscope, with a cauterization loop to avail for resection of tissue